Wagners is a former settlement in Butte County, California. It appears on maps as of 1897.

References

External links

Former settlements in Butte County, California
Former populated places in California